LifeFlight Australia is an aero-medical organisation headquartered in Brisbane, Queensland, Australia. Until July 2016, it was known as CareFlight, but was renamed to avoid confusion with the CareFlight organisation headquartered in New South Wales. Over 62,000 Critical Rescues have been completed since 1979.

History 
In 1981 the Gold Coast Helicopter Rescue Service was established on the Gold Coast by Ashley van de Velde to provide rapid rescue services on the Gold Coast beaches and hinterland via helicopter. In 1992 under the new name of CareFlight Group QLD Limited, the rescue services were expanded to cover southern Queensland and northern New South Wales. In 1993, the Royal Automobile Club of Queensland sponsored the service with naming rights so the service became known as RACQ CareFlight.

In 2013 former Queensland Premier Rob Borbidge became chairman of Careflight.

Clive Berghofer of Toowoomba has been a generous benefactor of the organisation. By 2014, he had donated $1 million over 10 years. His contribution is recognised by naming the organisation's hangar at Toowoomba City Aerodrome after him and the helicopter that operates from Toowoomba.

On 11 July 2016, Rob Borbidge, chairman of CareFlight, announced that the organisation would be renamed LifeFlight to avoid confusion with a similar organisation CareFlight New South Wales. The organisation would be renamed LifeFlight. RACQ remain the major naming rights sponsor of the RACQ LifeFlight Rescue helicopter service.

Bases 
Australia: Brisbane Airport, Archerfield Airport, Sunshine Coast Airport, Toowoomba Airport, Bundaberg, Roma, Mount Isa Airport

Singapore: Seletar Airport

Subsidiaries 
RACQ LifeFlight Rescue: LifeFlight Australia is most commonly known for its subsidiary RACQ LifeFlight Rescue which is a non for profit community rescue service utilising Rotary and Fixed Wing aircraft. The service runs off generous donations and large government supported funding. The aircraft are generally staffed by a Pilot, Aircrew Officer, Intensive care flight paramedic or nurse and Queensland Health Critical Care Doctor.  The Primary Sponsor is RACQ a motoring club and mutual organisation, providing roadside assistance, insurance, travel, finance and other services.

LifeFlight Commercial: In close conjunction with Starflight this is the commercial arm of LifeFlight and provides; Program management, Contract Management and oversight, Stakeholder engagement, Performance management, Support services (Ie: Finance/HR etc), Communications Media/Marketing.

LifeFlight Training Academy: This is a training arm of LifeFlight which completes training of Aircrews for operations in the aviation industry, located at Brisbane Airport the facility is home to Helicopter Underwater Escape Training (HUET), a full size THALES AW139 Simulator, indoor pool, VR Simulators  both Medical and Aircrew as-well as classrooms.

LifeFlight Air Ambulance: The Fixed Wing arm of the fleet consisting of Learjet 45's and Bombardier Challenger 600 conducting domestic and international aeromedical missions they are crewed by a Captain, First Officer, Critical Care Doctor and a Flight Nurse. The Jets are commonly used by insurance companies and for use on behalf of Queensland Health.

Fleet

Current Fleet 

As of October 2022, the LifeFlight Australia fleet consists of the following aircraft:

References

External links 

Air ambulance services in Australia
Health charities in Australia
Medical and health organisations based in Queensland